Barry Philip Jones (29 September 1941 – 13 February 2016) was the ninth Roman Catholic Bishop of Christchurch, New Zealand. He succeeded Bishop Cunneen in 2007.

Born in Rangiora, New Zealand, in 1941, Jones received his education at St Joseph's Convent Primary and St Bede's College, Christchurch.  He studied for the priesthood at Holy Name Seminary (Christchurch), and at Holy Cross Seminary College, Mosgiel. He was ordained a priest on 4 July 1966, aged 24, by Bishop Ashby. On 28 June 2006 he was appointed as Coadjutor Bishop of Christchurch, and consecrated on 4 October 2006.

On 4 May 2007 Jones succeeded to the position of Bishop of Christchurch on the retirement of his predecessor John Cunneen. In 2015, he suffered a number of strokes and his health declined. He decided to step down when he turned 75. Following a heart attack, Jones died on 13 February 2016.

References

External links
 Catholic Hierarchy website, Bishop Barry Philip Jones (Retrieved 28 January 2011).

1941 births
2016 deaths
21st-century Roman Catholic bishops in New Zealand
People from Rangiora
Roman Catholic bishops of Christchurch
People educated at St Bede's College, Christchurch
Holy Name Seminary alumni
Holy Cross College, New Zealand alumni